Carlos Germano Schwambach Neto (born 14 August 1970), better known as Carlos Germano, is a former Brazilian footballer who played goalkeeper.

He was a member of the Brazilian squads that won the 1997 Copa América and that reached the final of the 1998 FIFA World Cup in France.

Club career

He began his football career in 1985 in his native town, and was discovered by Vasco's manager who proposed that he join the youth team for a test. In the same year he became the first choice goalkeeper for the youth side.

When Vasco's senior goalkeeper Acácio left the club, Carlos Germano became the number 1 immediately. He went to receive all of the club honours and was chosen top goalkeeper of the Brazilian Championship in 1997.

In 1999, he had some disagreements with Vasco's chairman and left the club. He signed with Santos in 2000 for four years, but one year later the club could not pay the total amount of the contract and he obtained the right to a free transfer, moving to Portuguesa. From then on, he signed one year contracts with different clubs, including his first club (Vasco), until he signed with FC Penafiel (Portuguese side at the time in the second division) in 2005.

International career
Carlos Germano represented his country at the 1987 FIFA U-16 World Championship and the 1989 FIFA World Youth Championship. In 1988, he was chosen as Brazil's goalkeeper in the South American U-20 Championship.

He went on to earn 9 senior caps for Brazil between 1995 and 2001.

Coaching career
After retiring at the end of the 2005–06 Portuguese season, he subsequently embraced a career as a goalkeeping coach.

Honours

Club
Vasco da Gama
Campeonato Carioca (Rio de Janeiro State championship): 1992, 1993, 1994, 1998
Guanabara Trophy: 1992, 1994, 1998
Brazilian National Championship: 1997
Copa Libertadores Cup: 1998
Rio-São Paulo Tournament: 1999

International
Brazil
Copa América: 1997

Individual
Silver Ball (Placar): 1997

References

External links
 

1970 births
Living people
Sportspeople from Espírito Santo
Brazilian people of German descent
Association football goalkeepers
Brazilian footballers
Brazilian expatriate footballers
Brazil youth international footballers
Brazil under-20 international footballers
Brazil international footballers
1997 Copa América players
1998 CONCACAF Gold Cup players
1998 FIFA World Cup players
2001 FIFA Confederations Cup players
CR Vasco da Gama players
Santos FC players
Associação Portuguesa de Desportos players
Sport Club Internacional players
Botafogo de Futebol e Regatas players
Paysandu Sport Club players
F.C. Penafiel players
Campeonato Brasileiro Série A players
Expatriate footballers in Portugal
Copa América-winning players
Copa Libertadores-winning players